Erik Friberg is the name of:

Erik Friberg (footballer) (born 1986), Swedish footballer
Erik Friberg (poker player) (born 1983), Swedish poker player